Haigh Field Airport  is a public airport located three miles (4.8 km) southeast of the central business district (CBD) of Orland, a city in Glenn County, California, United States. It is mostly used for general aviation, and was used to train pilots during wartime.

World War II

During World War II, the airport was designated as Orland Air Force Auxiliary Field, and was an auxiliary training airfield for Chico Army Airfield, California.

See also

 California World War II Army Airfields

References

External links

Airports in Glenn County, California
Airfields of the United States Army Air Forces in California